Sapuyes is a town and municipality in the Nariño Department, Colombia.

Climate
Sapuyes has a cold highland Mediterranean climate (Csb). It has moderate rainfall year-round.

References

Municipalities of Nariño Department